Daffodils Public School is a school in Motihari, Bihar, India, established in 1994. It is the first school to be opened in Raghunathpur, Motihari and follows the Central Board of Secondary Education (CBSE) educational pattern. The school caters to children from nursery to Eighth Standard. Classes from Ninth to twelfth have been planned to be introduced.

Staff 
 Director : Sanjiv Ranjan Sinha
 Principal : Sanjiv Ranjan Sinha
 Vice Principal : Mrs. Anuradha Sinha

Education 
Daffodils Public School follows the CBSE Pattern. NCERT Publication books are used. The school provide its own study material to the Kindergarten students, and conducts its own internal exams for all Std. up to VIII.

About Daffodil School: Founder Details 

The commencement of this school begins in the year 1994. Initially, Daffodils school has lots of branches across India. Every branch of the school is affiliated with the Central Board Of Secondary Education. Every school follows the guidelines given by the board. The school has classes from the nursery to the higher secondary level. The medium that the school follows is English. The staff of the school is well educated and highly experienced. The environment of the school is well maintained and properly cleaned. Proper study environment given to the students is the priority of the school.

Infrastructure 
The school has a built-up area of 400 square feet (38 m2). It is a two-storey structure with a playground large enough to host all major sports. There is also a computer laboratory. On the ground floor, there is a conference room that is used for all major in-house events hosted for the students.

Sports and co-curricular activities 
The school conducts a major sports event on 24 September every year on the eve of birth-anniversary of its founder, late Upendra Nath Sinha. The school encourages co-curricular activities and holds at least one competition each month.

External links 
 Official Website

References 

Schools in Bihar
1994 establishments in Bihar
Educational institutions established in 1994